(Montague) Brian Lea , OBE (born 1934) was Archdeacon of Northern France from 1986 to 1994.

Draper was educated at St John's College, Cambridge then St John's College, Nottingham. After curacies at Emmanuel Church, Northwood and St George, Barcelona he was Vicar of Hove then St Michael, Paris. After his time as Archdeacon he was the incumbent at East Hoathly Church then St and St Philip, The Hague.

Notes

1934 births
Alumni of St John's College, Cambridge
Alumni of St John's College, Nottingham
Officers of the Order of the British Empire
Archdeacons of Northern France
Living people
20th-century English Anglican priests
21st-century English Anglican priests